The Valea Morii is a right tributary of the Pârâul de Câmpie in Romania. It flows into the Pârâul de Câmpie near Grădini.

References

Rivers of Romania
Rivers of Mureș County